"So Very Hard to Go" is a torch song performed by American rhythm and blues band Tower of Power, issued as the second single from their eponymous third album. It was produced by the band and written by band members Emilio Castillo and Stephen Kupka, with Lenny Williams performing the vocals. The song is the band's biggest hit to date in the United States, peaking at No. 17 on the Hot 100 on 28 July 1973 and No. 4 on KHJ on 31 July 1973.

Charts

Weekly charts

Year-end charts

Cover versions
"So Very Hard to Go" was covered by Filipino singer Martin Nievera for his 1999 album Return to Forever.

”So Very Hard to Go" was covered in April 2022 by the Moscow-based Chicago tribute band Leonid and Friends featuring new singer Michael Puntov

Popular culture
The song appears in the 2016 video game Watch Dogs 2.

References

^ "Tower Of Power - So Very Hard To Go / Clean Slate at Discogs". Discogs. Zink Media. Retrieved August 13, 2015. 
2.^ Jump up to: a b "So Very Hard to Go - Tower of Power | Listen, Appearances, Song Review | AllMusic". AllMusic. All Media Network. Retrieved August 10, 2015. 
3.^ Jump up to: a b "Tower Of Power - So Very Hard To Go / Clean Slate (Vinyl) at Discogs". Discogs. Zink Media. Retrieved August 13, 2015. 
4.^ Jump up to: a b "Tower of Power | Awards | AllMusic". AllMusic. All Media Network. Retrieved August 13, 2015. 
5.^ "So Very Hard to Go - Tower of Power | WhoSampled". WhoSampled. Retrieved August 13, 2015. 
6.^ Whitburn, Joel (1993). Top Adult Contemporary: 1961–1993. Record Research. p. __. 
7.^ Pedro. "Longbored Surfer - 1973". LongboredSurfer.com. Retrieved August 13, 2015.

External links
 
 

1973 songs
1973 singles
Tower of Power songs
Warner Records singles